In cuisine, an omelette (also spelled omelet) is a dish made from beaten eggs, fried with butter or oil in a frying pan (without stirring as in scrambled egg). It is quite common for the omelette to be folded around fillings such as chives, vegetables, mushrooms, meat (often ham or bacon), cheese, onions or some combination of the above. Whole eggs or egg whites are often beaten with a small amount of milk, cream, or water.

History

The earliest omelettes are believed to have originated in ancient Persia. According to Breakfast: A History, they were "nearly indistinguishable" from the Iranian dish kookoo sabzi.

According to Alan Davidson, the French word omelette came into use during the mid-16th century, but the versions alumelle and alumete are employed by the Ménagier de Paris (II, 4 and II, 5) in 1393. Rabelais (Gargantua and Pantagruel, IV, 9) mentions an homelaicte d'oeufs, Olivier de Serres an amelette, François Pierre La Varenne's Le cuisinier françois (1651) has aumelette, and the modern omelette appears in Cuisine bourgeoise (1784).

Alexandre Dumas discusses several variations of omelette in his Grand dictionnaire de cuisine. One is an omelette  with fresh herbs (parsley, chives and tarragon), another is a variation with mushrooms that Dumas says may be adapted using green peas, asparagus, spinach, sorrel or varieties of truffles. The "kirsch omelette " (or rum omelette) is a sweet omelette made with sugar and liquor, either kirsh or rum. The omelette is rolled and sprinkled with powdered sugar. A hot poker is used to burn a design into the omelette and it is served with a sweet sauce made of liquor and apricot jam. Another sweet omelette, attributed to a royal cook of Prussia, is made with apples and brown sugar glaze. Of the Arabian omelette, Dumas writes "I have been concerned in this book to give the recipes of peoples who have no true cuisine. Here, for example, is a recipe the Bey's cook was good enough to give me." The omelette itself is made with an ostrich egg and served with a spicy tomato-pepper sauce.

Variations by country

China
 Egg foo yung, a Cantonese omelette made with beaten eggs and usually ham
 An oyster omelette, a dish of Hokkien and Teochew origin made with oysters, starch and egg batter

France
 Depending on sources, a standard omelette is cooked in butter on medium (or sometimes high) heat, is supposed to be golden brown or "unbrowned or very lightly browned" on the outside and soft in the inside (though variations are possible according to preferences); according to some American cookbooks reflecting high-end restaurant practices, a "French Omelette" should be unbrowned, cooked slowly over medium-low to medium heat, with initial stirring to prevent curds and sticking. Good with just salt and pepper, this omelette is often flavored with finely chopped herbs (often fines herbes or tarragon, chervil, parsley and chives) or chopped onions.
 The omelette de la mère Poulard, a Norman specialty first developed in Mont-Saint-Michel, has been called the most famous omelette in the world. It is served without fillings but often served with heavy garnishes.

 The Provençal omelette is more similar to a frittata than to a traditional rolled or folded French omelette. The eggs are cooked like a traditional French omelette until the time any fillings are added; instead of adding fillings in a strip or on half the omelette, they are scattered over the entire surface of the omelette, and then the entire omelette is flipped and slipped back into the pan to cook what had been the top and is now the bottom. A  tourne omelette or vire omelette, a concave platter similar to a cake plate, is often used as an aid and can be used to serve the finished omelette. According to Bernard Duplessy the tourne omelette dates to "several centuries before Christ". 
 Crespéou, another Provençal dish (also called gateau d'omelettes or omelettes en sandwich), is made by stacking open-faced omelettes.

India
 In Parsi cuisine, pora is an omelette made from eggs, onion, tomato, green chillies, and coriander leaves. It is usually served for breakfast with Indian/Irani tea and bread.

Indonesia
 In Betawi cuisine, kerak telor is a traditional spicy omelette that made from glutinous rice cooked with egg and served with serundeng (fried shredded coconut), fried shallots and dried shrimp as topping.
 Fuyunghai or puyonghai is a Chinese Indonesian omelette, usually made from the mixture of vegetables such as carrots, bean sprouts, and cabbages, mixed with meats such as crab, shrimp, or minced chicken.

Iran
Kuku is an omelette frequently containing large proportions of other ingredients, including herbs, folded in.
Nargesi or spinach omelette, an Iranian dish, is made with fried onions and spinach, and is spiced with salt, garlic, and pepper.

Italy
 A frittata is a kind of open-faced Italian omelette that can contain cheese, vegetables, or even leftover pasta. Frittatas are cooked slowly. Except for the cooking oil, all ingredients are fully mixed with the eggs before cooking starts.

Japan
 In Japan, tamagoyaki is a traditional omelette in which eggs are beaten with mirin, soy sauce, bonito flakes, sugar and water, and cooked in a special rectangular frying pan.
Omurice (from the French word "omelette" and English word "rice") is an omelette filled with fried rice and usually served with a large amount of tomato ketchup. Omu-soba is an omelette with yakisoba as its filling. There are several styles of this dish, including omelette cooked and filled with fried rice, a soft-cooked omelette served over the fried rice that is then sliced open, and a "tornado" style omelette over the rice.
 Tenshindon is a Japanese-Chinese specialty, consisting of a crab meat omelette on rice.

Korea
In Korean cuisine, traditional omelettes are known as gyeran-mari (계란말이, "rolled-eggs") which is a type of savory banchan. Gyeran-mari is made with beaten eggs, mixed with finely diced vegetables, meats, and seafood. This side dish is often found in most Korean banquet (janchi) meals, as well as Korean fast food (bunsik) restaurants.

Mesoamerica
While the Spanish term tortilla and torta in Spain and the Philippines is applied to an omelette dish, in Mesoamerica it is a surrogate term for a flatbread made of wheat or corn. An omelette in Mesoamerica is commonly termed as tortilla de huevos, and more colloquially, omleta.

Philippines
In the Philippines, omelettes are known as torta, usually encountered with the enclitic -ng ("tortang") indicating it modifies the next word (the  main ingredient); e.g. tortang hipon = torta ("omelette") + -ng and hipon ("shrimp"), meaning "shrimp omelette". There are many types of torta which are named based on their main ingredients. They include:

 Tortang alamang or tortang hipon - an omelette with krill or small shrimp. Also known as shrimp fritters, although this term usually refers to okoy, a fritter made with shrimp and various vegetables (as well as other variations without shrimp).
Tortang carne norte - an omelette made from corned beef mixed with eggs. A common cheap breakfast dish.
Tortang dulong or maranay - an omelette, usually crispy, made with tiny fish from the family Salangidae known as dulong in Tagalog and ipon, libgao, or maranay in Visayan. It is sometimes called okoy, though traditional okoy is not an omelette, but rather a type of fritter made with glutinous rice.
 Tortang giniling or tortang picadillo - an omelette with ground meat (usually beef or pork) and sautéed vegetables.
 Tortang gulay - an omelette with peppers, mushrooms, onion, and garlic.
 Tortang kalabasa - an omelette made with finely julienned calabaza, eggs, flour, and salt.
 Tortang kamote - an omelette made with mashed sweet potato, eggs, flour, and salt.
 Tortang sardinas - an omelette made with shredded canned smoked sardines (tinapa)
 Tortang talong - an eggplant omelet with whole grilled eggplants. Versions stuffed with ground meat (giniling) and vegetables are called relyenong talong.

Pontic Greeks
 is an omelette made by the Pontic Greeks. Foustoron is made with eggs fried in butter or oil; the omelette can be served plain or seasoned. Some modern varieties include yogurt and cheese. The recipe varied widely by region: some recipes included onion and dried red peppers, while others did not.

Spain
 The Spanish tortilla de patatas, or tortilla española in other Spanish-speaking countries, is a traditional and very popular thick omelette containing sliced potatoes sautéed in cooking oil. It often includes sliced onions (tortilla de patata con cebolla) and less commonly other additional fillings, such as cheese, bell peppers, or diced ham.

Thailand
 In Thai cuisine, a traditional omelette is called khai chiao ไข่เจียว (khai meaning "egg", and chiao meaning oil-fried), in which the beaten egg mixture and a small quantity of fish sauce is deep fried in a wok filled with 1-2 cups of vegetable oil and served over steamed rice. The dish is usually served with Sriracha sauce and cilantro. A variation on this dish is khai chiao songkhrueang, where the plain egg omelette is served together with a stir-fry of meat and vegetables. Yet another type of Thai omelette is khai yat sai, literally "eggs filled with stuffing".

United Kingdom 
An omelette Arnold Bennett incorporates smoked haddock, hard cheese (typically Cheddar), and cream. It was created at the Savoy Grill in London for the writer Arnold Bennett, who was a frequent customer, by the chef Jean Baptiste Virlogeux. It remains a British classic; cooks from Marcus Wareing to Delia Smith and Gordon Ramsay have published their recipes for it.

United States
  A Denver omelette, also known as a Southwest omelette or Western omelette, is an omelette filled with diced ham, onions, green bell peppers, though there are many variations on fillings. Often served in the Southwestern United States, this omelette sometimes has a topping of cheese and a side dish of hash browns or fried potatoes.
 A hangtown fry, containing bacon and breaded oysters, is an unusual omelette that originated in Placerville, California, during the gold rush.
 An egg white omelette is a variation which omits the yolks to remove fat and cholesterol, which reside exclusively in the yolk portion of an egg.

Gallery

See also

List of egg dishes
List of brunch foods
Shakshouka
Bánh xèo

References

External links

 
World cuisine
Types of food
Breakfast
Iranian cuisine
Ancient dishes